Zinc finger protein 367 is a protein that in humans is encoded by the ZNF367 gene. The human gene is also known as ZFF29 and CDC14B; the orthologue in mice is Zfp367. ZNF367 contains a unique Cys2His2 zinc finger motif and is a member of the zinc finger protein family.

Model organisms

Model organisms have been used in the study of ZNF367 function. A conditional knockout mouse line, called Zfp367tm1a(KOMP)Wtsi was generated as part of the International Knockout Mouse Consortium program — a high-throughput mutagenesis project to generate and distribute animal models of disease to interested scientists.

Male and female animals underwent a standardized phenotypic screen to determine the effects of deletion. Twenty six tests were carried out on mutant mice, but no significant abnormalities were observed.

References

Further reading 
 

Human proteins
Genes mutated in mice